James Galvin (born 1951) is the author of seven volumes of poetry, and two novels.  He teaches at the Iowa Writers' Workshop in Iowa City, Iowa.

Biography
James Galvin was born in Chicago, Illinois in 1951 and was raised in Northern Colorado. He earned a BA from  Antioch College in 1974 and a MFA from the University of Iowa Writers' Workshop in 1977.

After receiving his MFA, Galvin taught at Murray State University in Kentucky for two years and Humboldt State University in California for three years. He later joined the faculty at the prestigious Iowa Writers' Workshop where he continues to teach each year.

Galvin has published seven poetry collections and a compilation of his work, Resurrection Update: Collected Poems 1975–1997 (Copper Canyon Press, 1997). Galvin is also the author of the prose book The Meadow (Henry Holt, 1992), which recounts the hundred-year history of a ranch on the Colorado–Wyoming border; and the novel Fencing the Sky (Henry Holt, 1999), about the destruction of rangelands and concomitant social changes in the western United States.

Galvin has been the recipient of fellowships from the National Endowment for the Arts, the Ingram Merrill Foundation, and the Guggenheim Foundation.

Galvin divides his time between Iowa City, and  Wyoming.

Awards
 Lila Wallace-Reader's Digest Foundation Award
 Lannan Literary Award 2002
 Guggenheim Fellowship
 Ingram Merrill Fellowship
 National Endowment for the Arts Fellowship
 Finalist, the Los Angeles Times Book Award and the Lenore Marshall Poetry Prize for Resurrection Update: Collected Poems 1975-1997

Selected poetry collections
 Everything We Always Knew Was True (Copper Canyon Press, 2016)
 As Is (Copper Canyon Press, 2009)
 X: poems (Copper Canyon Press, 2003)
 Resurrection Update: Collected Poems 1975-1997 (Copper Canyon Press, 1997)
 Lethal Frequencies (Copper Canyon Press, 1995)
 Elements (1988)
  God's Mistress (1984) 
 Imaginary Timber (1980)

Fiction
The Meadow (Henry Holt, 1992)
Fencing the Sky (Henry Holt, 1999)

References

American male poets
Antioch College alumni
Iowa Writers' Workshop faculty
Living people
1951 births